Robert Carswell may refer to:

 Robert Carswell, Baron Carswell (born 1934), British law lord
 Robert Carswell (cricketer) (born 1936), New Zealand cricketer
 Robert Carswell (MP) for Wallingford (UK Parliament constituency)
 Robert Carswell (pathologist) (1793–1857), the first illustrator of Multiple Sclerosis
 Robert Carswell (American football) (born 1978)
Robert Corteen Carswell (born 1950), Manx language and culture activist